Dunsany's chess, also known as Dunsany's game, is an asymmetric chess variant in which Black has the standard chess army and White has 32 pawns. This game was invented by Lord Dunsany in 1942. It was published the same year in Fairy Chess Review (August issue) and in Joseph Boyer's Nouveaux Jeux d'Echecs Non-orthodoxes.

A similar game is Horde chess.

Game rules
Black's setup is the same in regular chess; White's army consists of 32 pawns, filling  one through four, as shown in the diagram. Rules are the same as in regular chess, with the following exceptions:
 Black moves first. 
 Only Black's pawns have the two-step option on their first move. 
 Black wins by capturing all 32 white pawns; White wins by checkmating Black. 

Horde chess

Horde chess, by Filip Rachunek in 2002, is similar to Dunsany's chess but with the following differences:
 White's pieces are the normal chess pieces, and Black's pieces are 32 pawns, occupying ranks five through eight, but with pawns on d4 and e4 instead of d8 and e8.
 White moves first.
 Black's pawns on rank seven have the two-step option of regular chess.

Horde chess is one of the few chess variants to have a full theory book written about it.

Horde variant

A Horde variant uses the opening setup shown in the diagram. In this variant, White's pawns on the first and second ranks may advance one or two steps, provided that the path on the file is free. Unlike in regular chess, this does not have to be the pawn's first move.

Both Lichess and Chess.com have support for this variant.

References

External links
 The Definitive Guide to Horde Chess: Openings, strategies and tactics for White and Black, a theory book on Horde Chess
 Dusany's Chess by Hans Bodlaender, The Chess Variant Pages
 Lord Dunsany's Chess a simple program by Ed Friedlander (Java)
 Dunsany's Chess playable online at Green Chess
 Horde Chess Blog, a blog about the Horde variant

Chess variants
Edward Plunkett, 18th Baron of Dunsany
1942 in chess
Board games introduced in 1942